Esteban Maximiliano Andrada (born 26 January 1991) is an Argentine professional footballer who plays as a goalkeeper for Liga MX club  Monterrey.

International career
Andrada represented the Argentina U20s at the 2009 Toulon Tournament, 2011 South American Youth Championship, and the 2011 FIFA U-20 World Cup. He also represented the Argentina U22 squad at the 2011 Pan Am tournament.

He made his debut for the Argentina national football team on 26 March 2019 in a friendly against Morocco, as a starter. He was one of the three goalkeepers called up by manager Lionel Scaloni for the 2019 Copa América, but withdrew from the squad on 14 June due to a knee injury. He was replaced by Juan Musso.

Honours
Lanús
 Argentine Primera División: 2016
 Copa Bicentenario: 2016
 Supercopa Argentina: 2016
 Copa Sudamericana: 2013
Copa Libertadores runner-up: 2017
Boca Juniors
Primera División: 2019–20
 Supercopa Argentina: 2018
 Copa de la Liga Profesional: 2020
 Copa Libertadores runner-up: 2018
Monterrey
CONCACAF Champions League: 2021
Argentina
 Superclásico de las Américas: 2019

References

External links

Living people
1991 births
Sportspeople from Mendoza, Argentina
Argentine footballers
Argentina under-20 international footballers
Argentina youth international footballers
Argentina international footballers
Argentine Primera División players
Club Atlético Lanús footballers
Arsenal de Sarandí footballers
Boca Juniors footballers
C.F. Monterrey players
Association football goalkeepers
Pan American Games medalists in football
Pan American Games silver medalists for Argentina
Footballers at the 2011 Pan American Games
Medalists at the 2011 Pan American Games